The 1997 Australian Formula Ford Championship was a CAMS sanctioned Australian motor racing title for drivers of Formula Ford racing cars. It was 28th national series to be held in Australia for Formula Fords and the fifth to be contested under the Australian Formula Ford Championship name. The championship, which was promoted as the Ford Motorsport / Slick 50 Australian Formula Ford Championship, was won by Western Australian Garth Tander, driving a Van Diemen RF95.

Calendar
The championship was contested over an eight round series with two races per round.

Points system
Championship points were awarded on the results of each race as per the following table.

Results

References

Australian Formula Ford Championship seasons
Formula Ford Championship